The northern tropical pewee (Contopus bogotensis) is a species of bird in the family Tyrannidae. It is found in southeastern Mexico to northern South America from northern Colombia to northeastern Brazil. Its natural habitat is subtropical or tropical moist montane forests.

References

Contopus
Birds described in 1850
Taxa named by Charles Lucien Bonaparte